Pelecystola is a genus of moths belonging to the family Tineidae.

Species
Pelecystola decorata Meyrick, 1920
Pelecystola fraudulentella (Zeller, 1852)
Pelecystola melanchares (Meyrick, 1937)
Pelecystola nearctica S. Davis & D. Davis, 2009
Pelecystola polysticha (Meyrick, 1938)
Pelecystola strigosa (Moore, 1888) (= Euplocamus hierophanta Meyrick, 1916 and Semioscopis maculella Matsumura, 1931)
Pelecystola tephrinitis (Meyrick, 1912)

References

Tineidae
Tineidae genera
Taxa named by Edward Meyrick